The Our Lady of the Rosary Cathedral Also Girardota Cathedral is a cathedral of the Catholic church under the invocation of the Virgin of the Rosary. It is a Neo-Romanesque style building, built in solid brick in sight, took 32 years to build and was designed by the French architect Charles Émile Carré (1863-1909), better known as Carlos Carré. The cathedral is located on the eastern side of the main park of the municipality of Girardota, north of the Aburrá Valley, (Antioquia) in the South American country of Colombia.

At first, the building began as a parochial church and in 1988 was elevated to the rank of cathedral, when Pope John Paul II by the Bull "Qui Peculiari" created the Diocese of Girardota establishing this municipality as the head of the new bishopric.

In addition, the cathedral is one of the main pilgrimage sites of the Valley of Aburrá, inside it is the image of the Fallen Lord of Girardota. He is credited with "hundreds of miracles" and pilgrims travel there to keep their promises.

See also
List of cathedrals in Colombia
Roman Catholicism in Colombia
Our Lady of the Rosary

References

Roman Catholic cathedrals in Colombia
Roman Catholic churches completed in 1988
20th-century Roman Catholic church buildings in Colombia